Colonia Santa Lucía is a colonia, in the Santa Lucía town, east of the municipality of Zumpango, in the State of Mexico near the Mexico City Santa Lucía Airport.

References

Zumpango
Neighborhoods in the State of Mexico